Bucket-handle may refer to:

 Bail handle
 Bucket handle movement, a movement of ribs
 Bucket-handle fracture, a child bone fracture
 B-J-K continuum, an Indecomposable continuum